Blue Mountain Stream flows into the Middle Branch Grass River near Newbridge, New York. The Blue Mountain Stream and Pleasant Lake Stream combine here to become Middle Branch Grass River.

References 

Rivers of St. Lawrence County, New York